John Richard Burgess (born 4 June 1943) is an Australian television and radio personality and host, often referred to as "Burgo" and from his radio days "Baby John Burgess" or "Baby John", as the youngest presenter at the station. He has been a staple of the industry for 58 years. He is best known for his long tenure hosting duties on the Australian version of game show Wheel of Fortune and as a breakfast radio host.

Radio presenter
Burgess has also hosted numerous radio shows throughout the years, he started in the industry when given a chance opportunity meeting John Laws, and joining his network radio station 2GB

On 25 September 2006 he started as breakfast show announcer for easy listening radio station 3MP in Melbourne.

On 12 December 2011 he took over from Johnny Young at 6IX Perth, departing the station in December 2015. Burgess returned to 6iX in a new timeslot on 22 April 2017.

Television hosting 
Burgess moved into television in the 1970s, when hosting the teenage music show "Turning On" on the Seven Network station HSV7. The series feature many popular music artists and bands including Zoot and Gilian Fitzgerald, one of the main dancers, and featured Judy Moody and Christine Kelson.

Burgess also hosted the long-running game show Wheel of Fortune on the Seven Network, taking over from original host Ernie Sigley in 1984 and remaining until 1996. He then hosted Catchphrase on Nine Network; it was eventually renamed Burgo's Catchphrase.

He also hosted the game show Pass the Buck in 2002, also on Nine Network.

John Burgess joined the cast of the reality comedy series Balls of Steel Australia on The Comedy Channel in 2012.

Health concerns
It was announced in February 2022, that Burgess that been admitted to the ICU at Royal Perth Hospital, after having acquired a bacteria infection which caused sepsis.

References

External links
 Official website
 

Australian radio personalities
1943 births
Living people
Australian game show hosts